The Specials is a DVD released by Shania Twain on November 20, 2001 in North America. It consists of two network specials that aired during the Come on Over era. The first concert is called Winter Break and was filmed at Miami's Bayfront Park Amphittheater for 10,000 people, and included footage of Twain in her hometown of Timmins, Ontario. It aired on CBS in March 1999. Elton John, Backstreet Boys and Leahy are all special guests during the show. The music video and cover for Twain's single Rock This Country! was taken from this show. The second special, entitled Come on Over, aired on November 25, 1999 and followed a Dallas Cowboys game at the Texas Stadium, in Dallas, for a crowd of 40,000 people.

Setlists

Certifications and sales

References

Shania Twain video albums
2001 video albums